Kursky railway terminal (Kursky vokzal), also known as Moscow Kurskaya railway station (Moskva-Kurskaya), is one of the ten railway terminals in Moscow. It was built in 1896, and renovated (without major design changes) in 1938, then a large glass facade and modern roof was added in a 1972 expansion.
In 2008, there were plans to completely rebuild or refurbish the station. Kursky station, unlike most Moscow terminals, operates two almost opposite railroad directions from Moscow: one toward Kursk, Russia, after which the station is named, that stretches on into Ukraine, and another toward Nizhniy Novgorod, which is less used by long-distance trains, and is mostly for the high-speed service to Nizhniy. Kursky is connected to the Lengradskiy Line from the other side, enabling long-distance trains from St. Petersburg going on to other cities to pass through Russia's capital. Because of its three directions, its adjacency to the city center, and its connection to three major metro lines, Kursky is one of Moscow's busiest railway stations.

Destinations

Long distance from Moscow

Long distance via Moscow

High-speed rail

Note: Sapsan is now replaced with Talgo Strizh since 2015.

Other destinations

Suburban destinations
Suburban commuter trains (elektrichkas) connect Kursky station with the towns of Podolsk, Serpukhov, Chekhov, Tula on Kursky suburban railway line and Reutov (Reutovo), Balashikha, Zheleznodorozhny, Staraya Kupavna (Kupavna), Elektrougli, Elektrostal, Noginsk, Pavlovsky Posad, Elektrogorsk, Orekhovo-Zuevo, Kirzhach and Pokrov on the Gorkovsky suburban railway line. Besides that, Kursky Station has commuter connections with the Rizhsky and Belorussky suburban railway lines, as well as long-distance connection in the direction of Saint Petersburg, although less frequent.

Future development plan
Moscow Kurskaya station platforms should get reconstruction soon.

Proposed platform layout:

Gallery

References

External links
Kursky station Official site 
Russian Railways (Российские Железные Дороги) 

Buildings and structures in Moscow
Railway stations in Moscow
Railway stations of Moscow Railway
Railway stations in the Russian Empire opened in 1896
Line D2 (Moscow Central Diameters) stations